Glushitsy is a rural locality (a selo) in Karachunskoye Rural Settlement, Ramonsky District, Voronezh Oblast, Russia. The population was 187 as of 2010. There are 7 streets.

Geography 
Glushitsy is located on the right bank of the Voronezh River, 21 km north of Ramon (the district's administrative centre) by road. Nelzha is the nearest rural locality.

References 

Rural localities in Ramonsky District